KMLS may refer to:

 KMLS (FM), a radio station (95.5 FM) licensed to serve Miles, Texas, United States
 Miles City Airport (ICAO code KMLS)